The Ligas Provinciales de Lima y Callao, the second division of Peruvian football (soccer) in 1935 until 1940. The tournament was played on a home-and-away round-robin basis.

This championship remained in force until 1940. Initially the Liga Provincial de Lima played the role of the first division. However, the 1936 season, it became the lower category of the honor division. In that same year, the Liga Provincial de Lima merged with the Liga Provincial del Callao to form the Primera División Unificada de Lima y Callao. For the following years, Liga Provincial de Lima competed together with Liga Provincial del Callao to obtain promotion to the division of honor. Finally, the championship disappeared when the Liga Regional de Lima y Callao was formed in 1941.

For the years 1938 and 1939, the champions of each provincial league competed in a defining match for promotion.

The championship disappeared in 1941, after the creation of the Liga Regional de Lima y Callao. However, when the Regional League disappeared in 1951, the Liga Provincial de Lima returned for three years.

Liga Provincial de Lima

Primera División

Liga de Fútbol de Lima

División Intermedia

Segunda División

Tercera División

Footnotes

A. At the end of the season, the 10 best-placed teams were directly promoted to 1928 Primera División. These teams were Sportivo Unión, Alianza Chorrillos, Santa Catalina, Lawn Tennis, Alberto Secada, Jorge Washington, Alianza Callao, José Olaya, Jorge Chávez (C) and Unión.
B. At the end of the 1934 Segunda División season, the 4 best-placed teams were directly promoted to División Intermedia. These teams were Sport San Jacinto, Asociación Deportiva Tarapacá, Alianza Limoncillo and Independencia Miraflores. Also, Maurice Labrousse was promoted for winning the Special Promotion Series.
C. At the end of the 1934 Tercera División season, the 8 best-placed teams were directly promoted to Segunda División. These teams were Sport Arica Infantas, Roberto Acevedo, Victoria FBC, Eleven Boys, Alianza San Martín, Departamento de Lambayeque, Almagro Barranco and Atlético Miraflores.

Liga Provincial del Callao

Primera División

División Intermedia

References

External links
Campeonatos de 1936, 1939 y 1940.
Alianza Lima vs Social San Carlos 1939.
Cambios de Ligas Provinciales a Liga Regional de Lima y Callao.
Santiago Barrranco, Liga Provincial de Lima 1940.
Liga de Fútbol de Lima.

2
Peru
Defunct sports competitions in Peru